The Las Brujas Airport  is a domestic airport located in the town of Corozal, Sucre in Colombia. The airport is located 10 minutes from the capital of the department, the city of Sincelejo. In emergency situations, it serves as the alternate airport of the city of Montería. It has regional and national operations. 
Las Brujas operates regional and domestic flights to Barranquilla, Bogota and Medellin. 

Runway length includes a  displaced threshold on Runway 03 and a  displaced threshold on Runway 21.

The Corozal VOR-DME (Ident: CZU) is located on the field.

In 2016, the airport handled 71,181 passengers, and 81,472 in 2017.

History 
On July 12, 1939, the first plane landed, inaugurating the services of the Las Brujas airport, which had been under construction at the initiative of SCADTA and illustrious personalities since 1938. The opening flight of the airport was operated by the airline SCADTA (current Avianca), with a Sikorsky S-38 hybrid aircraft.

Airlines and destinations

Modernization of Las Brujas 
Las Brujas Airport, with passenger traffic of 46,100 passengers per year, will have major upgrade works that will impact positively on the region and the community. 
Among the works to be developed are: 
 Expansion of passenger terminal, with new furniture
 The extension of the runway
 Construction of a cargo terminal
 New covered walkway for passengers
 Improvement of facilities and equipment for the Airport Health Service
 Design of landscaping and external arrangements
 Strengthening the control tower
 Environmental Management Plans

See also
Transport in Colombia
List of airports in Colombia

References

External links
OpenStreetMap - Las Brujas
OurAirports - Las Brujas
SkyVector - Las Brujas

Buildings and structures in Sucre Department